Johannes Hermanus Barend Koekkoek (6 July 1840, Amsterdam - 24 January 1912, Hilversum) was a Dutch marine artist. He signed his paintings, and is perhaps better-known as, Jan H. B. Koekkoek.

Life and work 
He was a member of the famous ; third son of the marine artist, Hermanus Koekkoek. His brothers, Willem, Hermanus, and  also became painters. They all received their first art lessons from their father. He had his début at the Exhibition of Living Masters in 1859.

Most of his early works are in a style resembling his father's. Later, in 1864, he moved to Hilversum, where he came under the influence of the Laren School, then adopted stylistic elements from the Hague School. As a result, he came to favor relaxed scenes from the lives of fishermen and their families, rather than dramatic ocean views with ships.

He was married in 1877. Following family tradition, he tutored his son, who also painted landscapes and maritime scenes.

He was a member of Arti et Amicitiae, an artists' cooperative in Amsterdam. On their recommendation, he gave lessons to the landscape painter, .

References

Further reading 
 Frank Buunk, Nicole van der Schaaf: Romantiek rond de familie Koekkoek . Simonis & Buunk, Ede, 1994.

External links 

 A critical appreciation @ Simonis & Buunk
 More works by Koekkoek @ ArtNet

1840 births
1912 deaths
19th-century Dutch painters
20th-century Dutch painters
Dutch landscape painters
Dutch male painters
Dutch marine artists
Painters from Amsterdam
19th-century Dutch male artists
20th-century Dutch male artists